Terrace Hotel, or The Terrace Hotel, may refer to:

in Australia
St George's House, Perth, known also as Terrace Hotel

in the United States
Terrace Hotel (Lakeland, Florida), one of the Historic Hotels of America